This is an incomplete list of mantids and stick insects found in Australia.

Common species
 Titan stick insect, Acrophylla titan
 Tesselated phasmid, Anchiale austrotessulata
 Large brown mantis, Archimantis latistyla
 Monster mantis, Archimantis monstrosa
 Spur legged phasmid, Didymuria violescens
 Goliath stick insect, Eurycnema goliath
 Darwin stick insect, Eurycnema osiris
 Crowned stick insect, Onchestus rentzi
 Garden mantis, Orthodera ministralis
 Pink winged phasma, Podocanthus typhon
 False garden mantis, Pseudomantis albofimbriata
 Burying mantis, Sphodropoda tristis
 Purple-winged mantis, Tenodera australasiae
 Children's stick insect, Tropidoderus childrenii

References

External links
Chew, Peter. Brisbane Insects and Spiders.

'
.
insects and mantids
Australian
.